State Security Agency may refer to:
 State Security Agency of the Republic of Belarus
 State Security Agency (South Africa)

See also
National Security Agency (disambiguation)
National Intelligence Agency (disambiguation)
Defence Intelligence Agency (disambiguation)